7th Ohio Battery was an artillery battery that served in the Union Army during the American Civil War.

Service
The 7th Ohio Battery was organized at Camp Dennison near Cincinnati, Ohio and mustered in for a three-year enlistment on January 1, 1862, under Captain Silas A. Burnap.

The battery was attached to 6th Division, Army of the Tennessee, to June 1862. Artillery, 4th Division, Army of the Tennessee and District of Memphis, Tennessee, to September 1862. Artillery, 4th Division, District of Jackson, Tennessee, to November 1862. Artillery, 4th Division, Right Wing, XIII Corps, Department of the Tennessee, to December 1862. Artillery, 4th Division, XVII Corps, to January 1863. Artillery, 4th Division, XVI Corps, to July 1863. Artillery, 4th Division, XIII Corps, to August 1863. Artillery, 4th Division, XVII Corps, to April 1864. Artillery, 1st Division, XVII Corps, to September 1864. Artillery, Post of Vicksburg, Mississippi, District of Vicksburg, Mississippi, to November 1864. Artillery Reserve, District of Vicksburg, Mississippi, to August, 1865.

The 7th Ohio Battery mustered out of service at Camp Dennison on August 11, 1865.

Detailed service
Moved to St. Louis, Mo., March 18; then to Pittsburg Landing, Tenn., April 6. Advance on and siege of Corinth, Miss., April 29-May 30, 1862. March to Memphis, Tenn., via Grand Junction, Lagrange, and Holly Springs June 1-July 21. At Memphis until September 6. March to Bolivar, Tenn., September 6–16. Battle of Hatchie River, Metamora, October 5. Grant's Central Mississippi Campaign November–December. Moved to Memphis, Tenn., and duty there until May 1863. Ordered to Vicksburg, Miss., May 13. Siege of Vicksburg, Miss., May 18-July 4. Assaults on Vicksburg May 19 and 22. Advance on Jackson, Miss., July 5–10. Siege of Jackson July 10–17. Assault on Jackson July 12. Ordered to Natchez, Miss., August 12, and duty there until November 11. Expedition to Harrisonburg, La., September 1–8. Moved to Vicksburg November 11 and camp at Big Black until February 1864. Meridian Campaign February 3-March 2. Champion Hill February 4. Duty at Vicksburg until May. Expedition to Yazoo City May 4–22. Benton May 7 and 9. Duty at Vicksburg until January 3, 1865. At Jackson and Hazelhurst as infantry until July.

Casualties
The battery lost a total of 33 men during service; 1 enlisted men killed, 1 officer and 31 enlisted men died of disease.

Commanders
 Captain Silas A. Burnap

See also

 List of Ohio Civil War units
 Ohio in the Civil War

References
 Dyer, Frederick H.  A Compendium of the War of the Rebellion (Des Moines, IA:  Dyer Pub. Co.), 1908.
 Ohio Roster Commission. Official Roster of the Soldiers of the State of Ohio in the War on the Rebellion, 1861–1865, Compiled Under the Direction of the Roster Commission (Akron, OH: Werner Co.), 1886–1895.
 Reid, Whitelaw. Ohio in the War: Her Statesmen, Her Generals, and Soldiers (Cincinnati, OH: Moore, Wilstach, & Baldwin), 1868. 
Attribution

External links
 Ohio in the Civil War: 7th Ohio Battery by Larry Stevens
 National flag of the 7th Ohio Volunteer Light Artillery
 Guidons of the 7th Ohio Volunteer Light Artillery

Military units and formations established in 1862
Military units and formations disestablished in 1865
Units and formations of the Union Army from Ohio
O
1862 establishments in Ohio